Uttar Pradesh State Highway 90 (UP SH 90) passes through Lakhimpur - Bijua - Palia - Gauriphanta and covers a distance of .

See also
 State highway
 State Highway (India)
 Lakhimpur Kheri district
 Dudhwa National Park

References

External links
 Lakhimpur Kheri official website
 State Highway 90 on Google Maps

Transport in Lakhimpur Kheri district
State Highways in Uttar Pradesh